Bill Reardon  is an American politician and educator.  He served in the Kansas House of Representatives from 1975 to 2004, when he was replaced in the House of Representatives by his wife Kathy.

He was born in, and is a lifelong resident of, Kansas City, Kansas. After attending Bishop Ward High School, he received a BA from Rockhurst College (now Rockhurst University) in 1963. He began teaching government and social studies at Bishop Miege High School in nearby Roeland Park and became the girls assistant basketball coach. He taught at the same school for the next 40 years. He earned his master's degree from University of Missouri–Kansas City. 
 
In 1974 he won the Democratic Party primary and then the general election. Reardon served 15 consecutive terms in the House, only the second state legislator to do so in the history of Kansas. An advocate for education, fair labor practices, social services, and opposition to capital punishment. Reardon and his wife Kathy have been married for over 40 years, and have three adult daughters.  He works as a lobbyist for the Kansas City Kansas School District.

References 

Living people
Politicians from Kansas City, Kansas
Democratic Party members of the Kansas House of Representatives
Rockhurst University alumni
People from Roeland Park, Kansas
Year of birth missing (living people)